Keith J. Greiner is a Republican member of the Pennsylvania House of Representatives. He has represented the 43rd district, based in eastern Lancaster County, since 2013.

Greiner graduated from Conestoga Valley High School and received a bachelor's degree in accounting from Penn State University. He has worked for over 25 years as a certified public accountant. Greiner entered electoral politics by successfully running for the Upper Leacock Township Board of Supervisors. At the time of his election to Harrisburg, he was the incumbent Lancaster County Controller.

Committee assignments 

 Appropriations, Subcommittee on Fiscal Policy - Chair
 Commerce
 Finance, Secretary
 Veterans Affairs & Emergency Preparedness

References

External links

Living people
Republican Party members of the Pennsylvania House of Representatives
21st-century American politicians
1965 births